World of Art (formerly known as The World of Art Library) is a long established series of pocket-sized art books from the British publisher Thames & Hudson, comprising over 300 titles as of 2021. The books are typically around 200 pages, but heavily illustrated. Unlike some concise or popular art books, the layout is traditional with text and pictures often on the same page, but segregated. The series was launched in 1958, and over 300 titles have been published in all; according to Christopher Frayling, former Principal of the Royal College of Art, "there are paint-stained copies in every art school in the land".

The World of Art series treats all subjects concerning the arts, but mostly art history, ranging from prehistoric cave art to contemporary art, from Graeco-Roman and Viking art to Central Asian and Japanese art, from academic art to outsider art. Perhaps the most classic book in the series is A Concise History of Painting: From Giotto to Cézanne by Michael Levey (of the National Gallery in London), originally published in 1962. This gives an authoritative introduction to European art history from the early use of perspective in Italy to the start of modern art at the beginning of the 20th century.

Other authors include: John Boardman, Herbert Read, Hans Richter, Edward Lucie-Smith, Philip Rawson, David Talbot Rice, Peter Murray and Linda Murray, Germain Bazin, and Griselda Pollock.

History

The series was initially titled The World of Art Library and published with black backgrounds on the back cover and spine, the front usually taken by a large image in colour. The earliest hardbacks were published with visually striking glossy dust jackets.

The series experienced its second revamp in 2001, at the time of the publication of its 300th title. According to a Thames & Hudson spokesman, the redesigned books are glossier to make them appear less 'text book-like'.

In 2020, World of Art was relaunched with a batch of new titles, the covers have been once again redesigned by Dutch design studio Kummer & Herrman, now using white as background. The design was inspired by the golden ratio. In regard to the relaunch, the director of Thames & Hudson Sophy Thompson remarked during an interview with The Bookseller: 'In looking at World of Art, we were looking at the changing art market. For me, it felt that not to rethink our legacy series was a mistake: we had to keep it fresh and updated.' Amongst the new titles it could be highlighted Monet by James H. Rubin, a refreshing reconsideration of the painter, and Central and Eastern European Art since 1950 by Maja and Reuben Fowkes.

The earliest titles were grouped into eight categories with colour codes: Architecture (orange), Artists (pink), Galleries (green), General (yellow), History of Art (blue), Modern Movements (red), Music (white) and New Directions (grey).

The series has been published in North America by Thames & Hudson and sometimes other publishers.

List of books in the series

See also 
 Livre d'art
 List of publishers
 Thames & Hudson's 'New Horizons' series

References

External links 
 
 List of books in 'World of Art' series at Publishing History

Art history books
Books about the arts
Series of non-fiction books
Book series introduced in 1958
Editorial collections
Illustrated books
Thames & Hudson books